Jamie Foreman (born 25 May 1958) is an English actor best known for his roles as Duke in Layer Cake (2004) and Bill Sikes in Roman Polanski's Oliver Twist (2005). In February 2023, Foreman announced he was returning to the BBC soap opera EastEnders as Derek Branning, having previously portrayed Derek from 2011 to 2012.

Career
Foreman played opposite Ray Winstone and Kathy Burke in Gary Oldman's Nil by Mouth (1997) and also featured in Elizabeth (1998), Gangster No. 1 (2000) and Sleepy Hollow (1999). He appeared in the 2006 Doctor Who episode "The Idiot's Lantern" and featured as a racist taxi driver in The Football Factory (2004). In the 2008 film Inkheart Foreman played Basta. He also appeared in one episode of Law and Order: UK in 2009.

His recent work for BBC Radio includes the title role in Wes Bell, directed by Matthew Broughton, and the six-part series Hazelbeach by David Stafford and Caroline Stafford. He also played a small role in I'll Sleep When I'm Dead.

In 2011, Foreman joined the cast of EastEnders as Derek Branning, taking over the role from Terence Beesley. It was later confirmed in 2012 that Foreman was leaving and that the character of Derek would be killed off.

He has appeared as Lenny in numerous episodes of Birds of a Feather. In 2015, he narrated the six-part series Double Decker Driving School for ITV.

Foreman played Albert Wilson in Home Front radio series on BBC Radio 4, starting from Season Six in December 2015.

Personal life
Jamie Foreman is the son of Maureen Foreman and Freddie Foreman, a former south London gangster. He was married to actress Carol Harrison and they have one son, Alfie.

Foreman is a fan of Tottenham Hotspur F.C.

Filmography

Film

Television

References

External links

Interview from 2005
Profile at BBC webpage

1958 births
English male film actors
Male actors from London
People from Bermondsey
Living people
English male television actors
English male radio actors